The Abdullatif Al Fozan Award for Mosque Architecture is an award established in 2011 that is awarded to designers and architects. It is awarded every three years. The winners are judged by a panel of international jurors who are experienced in the architecture of mosques. It was founded by Saikh Abdullatif Al Fozan.

Recipients

References

External links 
 Organisation website

Architecture awards